is a former Japanese football player.

Club statistics

References

External links

j-league

1986 births
Living people
Kochi University alumni
Association football people from Ehime Prefecture
Japanese footballers
J2 League players
Fagiano Okayama players
Association football forwards